Taking Chances is the tenth English-language and twenty-third studio album by Canadian singer Celine Dion, released by Columbia Records on 7 November 2007. Dion returned to the music scene after almost five years of performing A New Day... in Las Vegas. She collaborated on Taking Chances with various rock and pop producers, including John Shanks, Linda Perry, ex-Evanescence members Ben Moody and David Hodges, Kristian Lundin, Ne-Yo, Chuck Harmony, Tricky Stewart, Eurythmics' David A. Stewart, Kara DioGuardi, Emanuel Kiriakou, Anders Bagge, Peer Åström, Aldo Nova, Christopher Neil and Guy Roche. The album garnered mixed reviews from music critics, who noticed that "not many chances were taken after all".

Taking Chances has sold 3.1 million copies worldwide in 2007 alone and peaked inside top ten in various countries, including number one in Canada, Switzerland, South Africa and on the European Top 100 Albums. It has sold 1.1 million units in the United States and was certified Platinum by the RIAA. In Canada, after shipping over 400,000 copies, the album was certified four-times Platinum. The first single, "Taking Chances" was released in September 2007 and peaked inside top ten in various European countries and in Canada. In 2008, different songs were selected as the second single: "Eyes on Me" in the United Kingdom, "A World to Believe In" in Japan and "Alone" in North America. The latter was also released as third and final single in the United Kingdom. On 14 February 2008, Dion embarked on the year-long Taking Chances World Tour, which visited five continents and became one of the highest-grossing tours of all-time.

Background
On 24 August 2007, Dion's official website announced that the singer will release her new English-language album Taking Chances on 12 November 2007 in Europe and 13 November 2007 in North America. The album was also scheduled for release in Japan on 7 November 2007 and in Australia and New Zealand on 10 November 2007. Dion said about Taking Chances: "I think it represents a positive evolution in my career. I'm feeling strong, maybe a little gutsier than in the past, and just as passionate about music and life as I ever was". On 2 September 2007, album's cover became available for TeamCeline members. However, six days later, Columbia Records has made small changes to the Taking Chances cover. The first single form the album, "Taking Chances" was sent to radio stations on 10 September 2007 and the video of Dion recording the song in the studio was posted on Amazon.com. On 12 September 2007, Columbia Records informed in a press release that "Taking Chances" was written by Kara DioGuardi and Eurythmics' David A. Stewart, and produced by the Grammy Award–winner John Shanks, and that the album will be followed by the Taking Chances World Tour in 2008 and 2009. The music video for the first single was filmed on 17 September 2007 in several different locations in the Las Vegas area and directed by Paul Boyd. The video became available for TeamCeline members on 16 October 2007 and later premiered on television.

Content
The album was recorded mainly over a three-week period in July 2007 at Palm Studios in Las Vegas. Dion collaborated with a group of well-known songwriters and producers including: Linda Perry, Eurythmics' David A. Stewart, ex-Evanescence member Ben Moody, Ne-Yo, John Shanks, Kara DioGuardi, Kristian Lundin, Anders Bagge, Peer Åström, Aldo Nova, Tricky Stewart and Christopher Neil. One of Dion's favorite songs on the album is "That's Just the Woman in Me" written by Kimberley Rew, ex-member of Katrina and the Waves. "That's Just the Woman in Me" was offered to Dion fifteen years ago but it wasn't until she began working on her new album that she knew the song perfectly suited this new phase of her artistic development. Dion said: "I think this album represents a positive evolution in my career. As time goes by, and we have more experiences in life, it's easier to get in touch with our innermost feelings....to know more about what we really want, how we really feel". Other covers on the album include: Heart's "Alone", Platinum Weird's "Taking Chances", Linda Perry's "New Dawn" and Tim Christensen's "Right Next to the Right One".

Promotion

Dion visited the United Kingdom in late October 2007 and started promoting the album by singing "Taking Chances" on The X Factor on 27 October 2007. Later, she performed "Alone" and "Taking Chances" on Saturday Night Divas broadcast on 3 November 2007. Dion also filmed An Audience with Celine Dion which was broadcast on 22 December 2007 and performed "Taking Chances", "Eyes on Me", "Alone" and few of her previous hits including: "My Heart Will Go On", "Think Twice", medley of "It's All Coming Back to Me Now/Because You Loved Me/To Love You More", "I Drove All Night", "River Deep – Mountain High" and "The Prayer" in duet with Andrea Bocelli. Next, Dion visited France and sang "Taking Chances" and two of her French-language hits with the contestants on Star Academy on 2 November 2007. She also filmed performances of "Taking Chances" for two other French television shows, Hit Machine and Vivement Dimanche, which were broadcast on 1 December 2007 and 9 December 2007 respectively. On 4 November 2007, Dion flew to Monaco where she received the Legend Award at the World Music Awards and sang "Taking Chances". This performance was shown on television on 22 November 2007. On 7 November 2007, Dion visited Italy and performed "Taking Chances" and "I Knew I Loved You" on Domenica In, which was broadcast four days later. On 10 November 2007, she flew to Germany and sang "Taking Chances" on Wetten, dass..?.

The promotion in the United States started on 12 November 2007, when The Oprah Winfrey Show dedicated to Dion was broadcast on television. Dion filmed it before her visit to the United Kingdom and performed "Taking Chances", "Alone" and also few of her previous hits: "My Heart Will Go On", "Because You Loved Me", "A New Day Has Come" and "I Drove All Night". On 14 November 2007, Dion performed three songs on the Today, including "Taking Chances", "Alone" and "I Drove All Night". On the same day, The Ellen DeGeneres Show featuring Dion was broadcast and included performances of "Taking Chances" and "Because You Loved Me". Dion also sang "Taking Chances" at the American Music Awards on 18 November 2007 and on All My Children on 21 November 2007. On 23 November 2007, she performed "Taking Chances", "Alone" and "Because You Loved Me" on The Early Show and "Taking Chances" and "Alone" on The View. On 27 November 2007, Dion sang "Taking Chances" and "My Heart Will Go On" on the finale of Dancing with the Stars. The next day, she performed "Taking Chances", "Alone" and "The Christmas Song" at the Annual NYC Tree Lighting Ceremony. On 21 December 2007, two performances filmed during one of the last A New Day... concerts were shown on Larry King Live: "Taking Chances" and "The Christmas Song".

In late January 2008, Dion returned to France. On 25 January 2008, she appeared on Star Academy finale and sang "Alone" and two of her French-language hits with the contestants. The next day, Dion performed "Taking Chances" at the NRJ Music Awards where she received the NRJ Award of Honor. Before her second visit to France, Dion filmed That's Just the Woman in Me television special for the United States and Canada, which was broadcast on 15 February 2008. She sang "Taking Chances", "Alone", "Eyes on Me" Remix featuring will.i.am, "That's Just the Woman in Me", and also "Something" with Joe Walsh on guitar, "The Power of Love", "River Deep – Mountain High" and "The Prayer" in duet with Josh Groban. The latter track was released as a digital download on 12 February 2008.

On 14 February 2008, Dion started her Taking Chances World Tour which visited Africa, Asia, Australia, Europe and North America, and ended on 26 February 2009. The tour grossed over US$279 million becoming the third highest-grossing tour of all-time by a female artist, only behind Madonna's Sticky & Sweet Tour and MDNA Tour. The tour was chronicled in the Celine: Through the Eyes of the World documentary issued on DVD and Blu-ray in April 2010. The concert itself was released on DVD and CD at the same time as Taking Chances World Tour: The Concert and Tournée mondiale Taking Chances: Le spectacle.

Singles
The first single form the album, "Taking Chances" premiered on 10 September 2007 and was sent to radio stations around the world on the same day. The song was written by Kara DioGuardi and David A. Stewart, and produced by John Shanks. The digital single was released on 17 September 2007 and the CD single was issued in selected countries in late October and early November 2007. The Paul Boyd-directed music video was filmed in mid-September 2007 in Las Vegas and premiered on 17 October 2007. "Taking Chances" became a successful single in Europe peaking inside top ten in Denmark, Italy, Switzerland and France, and reaching top forty in Austria, Norway, Germany, Belgium Wallonia, Ireland and the United Kingdom. In North America, it peaked at number nine on the Canadian Hot 100 and number fifty-four on the US Billboard Hot 100. "Taking Chances" also reached number one on the US Hot Dance Club Songs and Canadian Adult Contemporary Chart. It has sold over 20,000 digital downloads in Canada receiving Gold certification and 500,000 digital copies in the United States.

In the United Kingdom, "Eyes on Me" was chosen as the second single. The song was written by Kristian Lundin, Savan Kotecha and Delta Goodrem, and produced by Lundin. The digital single was released on 4 January 2008 and the CD single was issued on 7 January 2008. The song peaked at number 113 on the UK Singles Chart. The music video for "Eyes on Me" with footages from the Taking Chances World Tour was released on 5 May 2008. In Japan, "A World to Believe In" written by Tino Izzo and Rosanna Ciciola, and produced by John Shanks was selected as the second track to promote the album. However, it was re-recorded as an English-Japanese duet with Yuna Ito, titled "あなたがいる限り: A World to Believe In". The song premiered on radio on 1 December 2007 and the music video debuted two days later. The video was filmed in Las Vegas in October 2007 during the recording of the song by both singers. The CD single was issued on 16 January 2008 and peaked at number eight on the Japanese Oricon chart. The music video for the second North American single, "Alone" was taken from That's Just the Woman in Me television special and released on 15 March 2008. The promotional single was sent to radio stations in Canada and United States in early April 2008. This cover of Heart's hit song was produced by Ben Moody. "Alone" was also chosen as the third and final single in the United Kingdom, and digitally released on 5 May 2008. The song peaked at number fifty-seven on the Canadian Hot 100, number eighty-five on the UK Singles Chart and number twenty-four on the US Bubbling Under Hot 100 Singles. "My Love", written and produced by Linda Perry, was included on Dion's next album, My Love: Essential Collection and released as a single from it in September 2008.

Critical response

Taking Chances received mixed reviews from most music critics upon release. At Metacritic, which assigns a normalized rating out of 100 to reviews from professional publications, the album received a weighted average score of 53 based on 8 reviews, indicating "mixed or average reviews".

Stephen Thomas Erlewine from AllMusic rated it 3 stars and said that Taking Chances is "an album of its time: it offers extravagance in the guise of self-help, which can be alluring in doses, especially those bizarre blues-rockers, but it's just too much of a very expensive yet not particularly tasteful thing. The Billboard review said that: "Packing an emotional wallop, Chances should quash critics who insist that Dion's voice is stainless steel". Bill Lamb of About.com rate the album three-stars out of five, and said: "listening to 16 consecutive songs can be an endurance test for even the most ardent Celine fan. 14 of the songs here suffer, to various degrees, from leaning to the ordinary or seeming to lack in inspired artistic fire. However, they are sandwiched by 2 brilliant tracks that, sadly, give a hint of what Taking Chances might have been". Sarah Rodhman from The Boston Globe commented that: "Are chances taken? Not many, but there are rewards if you're willing to enjoy Dion's precise vocalizing and the hooky songs".

The Entertainment Weekly review saw that: "It's cool that Dion can mimic everyone from Shakira to Sam Phillips...but her appalling Janis Joplin impression is a Chance too far". Sal Cinquemani from Slant Magazine opined that: "The laborious 16-track record purportedly finds the queen of adult contemporary-turned-Vegas attraction taking chances by modernizing her treacly power ballad sound with lots of overdubbed guitars and of-the-moment collaborators". The Amazon.com review was positive, saying that: "As far as standard Celine fare goes, in fact, Chances is likely her strongest non-French outing since 2002's A New Day Has Come; nobody unfolds a lyric with more care or nuance". The NOW review, expressed that: "The album is also comfortably ignorant of the times. With its feathery production and common pop arrangements, it could have come out in 1996". Edna Gundersen from USA Today said that: "With Chances, the diva seems to be stretching artistic muscles, yoga-style not aerobically, and seeking an escape from expectations". Ashante Infantry from Toronto Star concluded that: "Taking Chances, Dion's 10th album, finds her doing just that. With an obvious reach for contemporary radio, Dion padded the efforts of longtime collaborators with in-the-now hitmakers: Ne-Yo, Linda Perry and Ben Moody, who co-wrote the self-empowering anthem "This Time" about an abused woman breaking free. The result is an edgier rock sound that won't alienate loyal fans, but may engage some new ones".

Commercial performance
Two months before its official release worldwide, Taking Chances was among the most pre-ordered albums in Amazon priced at $9.99. According to IFPI, Taking Chances was the 8th best-selling album by a female artist of 2007 worldwide, with sales of over 3.1 million copies in 2007 alone.

Canada
In Canada, Taking Chances entered the chart at number one with 80,000 copies sold, surpassing Dion's own record for the biggest debut of 2007 (her French-language album D'elles sold 72,000 units in its first week in May 2007). Garnering two of the highest sales entries in Canada for two different albums in one year gave Dion an unprecedented achievement in Canadian Nielsen SoundScan history. In the second week, Taking Chances remained at the top of the chart, selling 44,000 copies. The next week, Dion fell to number two and stayed on this position for four consecutive weeks selling 39,000, 45,000, 37,000 and 43,000 units, respectively. Dion returned to the top of the chart for the final week of 2007, selling another 13,000 copies. Because of this commercial success, Taking Chances became the third best-selling album in Canada in 2007 according to Nielsen SoundScan, with sales of 301,000 units. The album spent two more weeks inside top ten in Canada. In July 2008, it was certified four-times Platinum by the CRIA for shipping over 400,000 copies. It also became the number-one album on the 2008 Billboard year-end chart in Canada.

United States
In the United States, Taking Chances debuted at number three selling 215,000 units. Later, it fell to number eight and remained at that position for two weeks with sales of 128,000 and 93,000 copies, respectively. For the next four weeks, the album stayed inside top twenty on the Billboard 200, selling 84,000 (number twelve), 92,000 (number fifteen), 134,000 (number eighteen) and 50,000 units (number twenty), respectively. Taking Chances was certified Platinum by the RIAA in February 2008 and has sold 1.1 million copies there as of May 2010.

Other markets
The album also reached number one in Switzerland, South Africa and on the European Top 100 Albums, and peaked inside top ten elsewhere. It was certified Gold in many countries, and Platinum or Multi-Platinum in others. According to IFPI, Taking Chances has sold 3.1 million copies around the world in 2007 alone.

Accolades

In 2008, Dion won World Music Award for World's Best Selling Canadian Artist of the Year. At the Juno Awards of 2008, she was nominated in six categories, including: Album of the Year (Taking Chances), Best Pop Album  (Taking Chances), Artist of the Year and Fan Choice Award. At the Juno Awards of 2009, Dion was nominated in three categories, including: Single of the Year ("Taking Chances") and Fan Choice Award.

Track listing

Notes
  signifies a co-producer
  signifies a vocal producer
  signifies remix

Charts

Weekly charts

Monthly charts

Year-end charts

All-time charts

Certifications and sales

Release history

See also
List of European number-one hits of 2007
List of number-one albums of 2007 (Canada)
List of number-one albums of 2008 (Canada)

References

External links
 

2007 albums
Albums produced by Aldo Nova
Albums produced by Christopher Neil
Albums produced by Emanuel Kiriakou
Albums produced by Guy Roche
Albums produced by John Shanks
Albums produced by Kuk Harrell
Albums produced by Linda Perry
Albums produced by Tricky Stewart
Celine Dion albums